The Cities of London and Westminster by-election of 4 November 1965 was held after the death of Conservative MP and Speaker of the House of Commons Harry Hylton-Foster.

The seat was safe, having been won at the 1964 United Kingdom general election by over 10,000 votes.

Labour's by-election candidate Alexander Pringle was a Chelsea borough councillor and Head of English at Westminster City School. He was the son of William Pringle, who had been a Liberal MP from 1910 to 1918 and 1922 to 1924.

Result of the previous general election

Result of the by-election

References

Cities of London and Westminster by-election
Cities of London and Westminster by-election, 1965
Cities of London and Westminster by-election, 1965
Cities of London and Westminster by-election
Cities of London and Westminster, 1965